Fettercairn distillery is a whisky distillery in Fettercairn.  Situated under the Grampian foothills in the Howe of Mearns, Fettercairn town’s name is loosely based on the phrase "the foot of the mountain".

The distillery is operated by Whyte & Mackay, which Philippines-based Alliance Global owns.

History

Fettercairn Distillery was founded in 1824 by Alexander Ramsay, owner of the Fasque estate, who converted a corn mill at Nethermill into a distillery.  After losing his fortune, Alexander was forced to sell the estate to the Gladstone family in 1829.
John Gladstone’s son William Gladstone, went on to become Prime Minister and Chancellor of the Exchequer and was instrumental in passing various reforms on the taxation of whisky.

In 1973 Whyte & Mackay acquired Fettercairn distillery and it has remained with the company since.

Emblems

The arch and the unicorn are two symbols that are heavily associated with Fettercairn.
The unicorn is said to stand for purity and strength and has been a symbol of Scotland since the reign of King Robert III. It is also used within the Ramsay clan crest, of which the founder Alexander Ramsay brought with him to the distillery.
The Fettercairn arch dominates the entrance to the town and was built to commemorate a visit by Queen Victoria and Prince Albert in 1861. This symbol has also been used in the design and logo of Fettercairn malts.

Products

Fettercairn is a pure spirit which is crafted by its unique stills and forged through temperate maturation.  Within its process, the distillery uses a unique irrigator ring that surrounds the stills which drenches the still to deliver only the purest spirit. In recent years, they have been experimenting with flavours from wood charring, with whisky aged in barrels made from locally sourced oaks.

Products available are:

Fettercairn 12 years old
Fettercairn 16 Years old
Fettercairn 22 years old
Fettercairn 28 years old
Fettercairn 40 years old
Fettercairn 50 years old
Fettercairn Fasque
Fettercairn Fior
Limited bottling of Fettercairn cask strength whisky 54°ABV
The following whiskies are now sold out
Fettercairn 24 years old
Fettercairn 30 years old

References

External links
 Fettercairn official website
 Whyte and Mackay official website

Distilleries in Scotland
Food and drink companies established in 1824
1824 establishments in Scotland